FC Denver is an American Soccer Club based in Denver, Colorado. The club plays in the Colorado Premier League (under USASA umbrella) and participates in regional and national tournaments the U.S. Open Cup, The Las Vegas Silver Mug, and Colorado State Cup tournaments. Previously, the club participated in the Premier Arena Soccer League between 2012 and 2014. The club has five men's teams (Premier, United, U19, Masters (Over-30), & Legends (Over-30)). Although the club's crest honors the colors of Denver's city flag, the club wears its traditional colors of green, white, and black.

History 

FC Denver was founded in winter 2005/2006 and played its first match in March 2006. FC Denver began as a single men's amateur soccer team playing in the now defunct Comets Soccer League. The club grew to four outdoor teams by 2011.

The club's top men's team, Premier, which has won the 2013 & 2015 Colorado State Cup. The win qualified them for the 2013-14 USSSA National Championships in March 2014 where they lost in the semifinals to eventual champion Colorado Rovers S.C.

During the Fall of 2017, FC Denver won three qualifying matches to qualify for the 2018 US Open Cup. FC Denver went on to win its 2018 US Open Cup Round 1 match vs Azteca FC by a 4-2 scoreline and lose 3–2 to USL team Colorado Switchbacks FC in Round. In Summer of 2018, the club announced its first youth team, a U19 team to begin league play in Spring 2019.

Honors 
US Open Cup 2018 Round 1 Winners - May 2018
US Open Cup 2018 Qualifiers - Fall 2017
CASL 1st Division Champions - Fall 2015
USSSA Colorado State Cup Champions - July 2015
USSSA National Cup Semifinalist - March 2014
USSSA Colorado State Cup Champions - July 2013
Choice Wireless Spring Soccer Showcase Champions - April 2013
CASL 1st Division Champions - Fall 2012
CASL 1st Division Champions - Fall 2011
Comets Soccer League Premier Division Champions - Spring 2007
Colorado State Cup Eid Cup Champions - August 2006

PASL Indoor Standings Year-by-year

Head coaches 

  Drew Melin (2015–Present)
  Luke Elbin (2013–2015)
  Kyle Firebaugh (2009-2012)
  Eric Fulton (2006-2008)

References

External links 
FC Denver official website

Premier Arena Soccer League website
Rocky Mountain Division website

Soccer clubs in Colorado
Soccer clubs in Denver
Association football clubs established in 2005
Premier Arena Soccer League teams